The Operational Group Ermakov was a grouping of three Field Armies of the Red Army, the 3rd, 13th, and 50th Armies. It fought during the Battle of Moscow on the Bryansk Front on the Eastern Front during World War II. It was named after its commander, then Major General Arkady Yermakov. Ermakov's command was controversial for his focus on offensive operations from mid August to late September 1941. Marshal Yeryomenko credited his command's actions for significantly weakening the strength of the German Attack Groupings. Conversely, General Sanalov criticized him for paying insufficient attention to the defense during this time, leading to later losses. It was disbanded.

Order of Battle 

3rd Army
13th Army
50th Army

Commanders

 Major General A.N. Ermakov

References

 Boris Vadimovich Sokolov. Marshal K.K. Rokossovsky: The Red Army's Gentleman Commander. 2015,,
 Lopukhovsky, Lev. The Viaz'ma Catastrophe, 1941: The Red Army's Disastrous Stand against Operation Typhoon. 2013, Helion and Company.

020